Sirnica may refer to:

 Pinca, a traditional Dalmatian, Istrian and Kotoran Easter sweet roll
 Cheese-filled burek in Bosnian-Herzegovinian cuisine